Tom Becka (born 1955) is an American talk radio personality who has hosted shows on KMBZ and KCMO in Kansas City, and KFAB and KOIL in Omaha as well as a short-lived stint at KRWK in Fargo, North Dakota. Before his career as a talk show host, Tom spent five years on the road as a stand-up comic.

References

External links
 TomBecka.com: official site
 

Living people
American libertarians
American motivational writers
American talk radio hosts
1955 births
People from Cleveland
Date of birth missing (living people)